The 2016 Minnesota Democratic presidential caucuses took place on March 1 in the U.S. state of Minnesota as one of the Democratic Party's primaries ahead of the 2016 presidential election.

On the same day, dubbed "Super Tuesday," Democratic primaries were held in ten other states plus American Samoa, while the Republican Party held primaries in eleven states including their own Minnesota caucuses.

Opinion polling

Results

Primary date: March 1, 2016
National delegates: 69

Analysis
Bernie Sanders scored an imperative, much-needed victory in the Minnesota caucus, a state he had targeted to keep his path to the nomination alive. With its populist, mostly white electorate, Minnesota was a state seen as favorable to Sanders based on his performance in previous caucus contests, which was only aided by high voter turnout, almost topping the record of 211,000 votes in the 2008 Minnesota Democratic Presidential Primary. Sanders ran up big margins in Minneapolis and the Minneapolis suburbs, and in the working-class, mostly white Iron Range of northern Minnesota which contains the city of Duluth, where he won north of 60% of the vote. Sanders won 76 out of 87 counties and all eight congressional districts in the state.

Sanders had campaigned hard for the state, appearing with Rep. Keith Ellison, the Congressional Progressive Caucus co-chair who endorsed Sanders in October 2015.

References

Minnesota
Democratic caucuses
2016